Synaphea flabelliformis is a shrub endemic to Western Australia.

It is found in the Wheatbelt region of Western Australia between Goomalling and Woodanilling where it grows in sandy-gravelly soils over laterite.

References

Eudicots of Western Australia
flabelliformis
Endemic flora of Western Australia
Plants described in 1995